Blaauw is a Dutch surname. It is an archaic spelling of modern Dutch blauw, meaning blue. This may have referred to the pale skin, the eyes, or the clothes of the original bearer of the name or the surname may be metonymic, e.g. referring to a dyer or someone who produced bluing in a mill. People with this name include:

Persons with the surname Blaauw include:
 Adriaan Blaauw (1914–2010), Dutch astronomer
2145 Blaauw, his namesake asteroid
 David Theodore Blaauw (born c.1965), American engineer
 Gerrit Blaauw (1924–2018), Dutch computer engineer and designer
 Marco Blaauw (b. 1965), Dutch trumpet player
 Marieke Blaauw (b. 1971), Dutch animator
 Ron Blaauw (chef) (b. 1967), Dutch head chef at an eponymic restaurant and TV-personality
 Wicus Blaauw (b. 1986), South African rugby player
 William Henry Blaauw (1793–1870), English antiquarian and historian

See also
Blaeu (disambiguation), variant spelling of the same surname, made famous by the cartographer family Blaeu
Blau (surname), German surname with the same meaning

References

Dutch-language surnames
Afrikaans-language surnames
Occupational surnames